"Sword from the Stone" is a song by English singer-songwriter Passenger. The song was released as a digital download on 8 January 2021 by Black Crow as the sixth single from his twelfth studio album, Songs for the Drunk and Broken Hearted. A new version of the song was released on 15 January 2021 titled 'Gingerbread Mix'.

Background
In an interview with the Official Charts Company regarding co-writing the song with Ed Sheeran, Passenger said, "When I wrote this song I sent it to him because I was excited about it. Within about seven minutes he had replied twice and then phoned me to tell me he thought it was something special. The pair decided Ed would create a 'poppier, punchier single mix of the song - something probably more viable for commercial radio. Ed’s so clever and he's got such a brilliant ear for that stuff. I love what he's done – the integrity and the soul of the song is still very much in tact – he's just Sheeran-ised it. It's brilliant to be mates with something like that who can help in such a way." In a statement, Passenger said, "Ed was really excited about the song when I played it to him and suggested that he produce a version that could potentially work as a radio single. It's not every day you have that kind of offer from a pop genius, and I'm so delighted with what he and Joe have come up with. It's been such a fun one to work on." He also talked about sharing the song with his friends and family and said, "I genuinely think it's had the best reaction of any song I've ever written."

Reception
The Independent criticized the song's lyrics for "primary school platitudes" such as "up and down like a yo-yo".

Music video
A music video to accompany the release of "Sword from the Stone" was first released onto YouTube on 8 January 2021. The video was directed by Raja Virdi.

Track listing

Personnel
Credits adapted from Tidal.
 Chris Vallejo – Producer
 Ed Sheeran – Producer
 Joe Rubel – Producer
 Michael David Rosenberg – Composer, lead vocalist

Charts

References

2021 songs
2021 singles
Passenger (singer) songs